Juliana Bragança Saúda Silveira, known as Juliana Silveira (born March 12, 1980) is a Brazilian actress and singer. She began her acting career on Malhação, a Brazilian telenovela aimed at teenagers.

Biography
In 2005 Juliana starred in Floribella, a musical soap opera for children, and recorded songs for its soundtrack.

Television

Telenovela

Music career
Soundtrack

Remix

Live

References

External links

1980 births
Living people
People from Santos, São Paulo
Brazilian people of Portuguese descent
Brazilian people of Italian descent
Brazilian telenovela actresses
21st-century Brazilian singers
21st-century Brazilian women singers
Citizens of Italy through descent